A Heart So White by Javier Marías was first published in Spain in 1992 (original title Corazón tan blanco.) Margaret Jull Costa's English translation was first published by The Harvill Press in 1995. The book received the International Dublin Literary Award in 1997. An edition was published by Penguin Books in 2012, with an introduction by Jonathan Coe.

Plot
The narrator, Juan, seeks to use his newly-wed wife, Luisa, to uncover the murky past of his father's previous marriages which include (aside from Juan's mother) two other women.  The first of these women is unnamed and kept secret from Juan, while the second was the older sister of Juan's mother.

Reception
The New York Times wrote "Marías's challenging and seductive technique reaches its pinnacle in A Heart So White." The Independent wrote that it "starts from a suicide to explore the secrets of two marriages with all the hypnotic, even sinister, beauty of his style" BOMB magazine described it as "traditional" and "refreshingly un-American." Marías and the translator Margaret Jull Costa were the joint winners of the International Dublin Literary Awards.

References

External links
"Stranger Than Fiction," by Wendy Lesser, New York Times, May 6, 2001.
A Heart So White reviewed by Ben Donnelly, Review of Contemporary Fiction, Spring 2001.

1992 novels
Novels by Javier Marías
20th-century Spanish novels
Editorial Anagrama books